Gopal Narayan Singh University (GNSU) is a private university located at Jamuhar village near the city of Sasaram in Rohtas district, Bihar, India. It is one of the first six private universities in Bihar. The university was notified in the Bihar Gazette following a decision of the Bihar cabinet on 5 June 2018 and has an official establishment date of 15 June 2018.

Departments and faculties 
 Faculty of Medicine
 Faculty of Nursing
 Faculty of Pharmacy
 Faculty of Management Studies
 Faculty of Information Technology
 Faculty of Agriculture
 Faculty of Law
 Department of Commerce
 Department of Mass Communication & Journalism
 Department of Library & Information Sciences

Campuses
The following institutes are listed as "campuses" of the institute:
 Narayan Medical College and Hospital
 Narayan Nursing College
 Narayan Academy of Managerial Excellence
 Narayan Institute of Pharmacy
 Narayan Institute of Agricultural Sciences
 Narayan School of Law
 Narayan Paramedical Institute & Allied Sciences

References

External links

Rohtas district
Universities in Bihar
Educational institutions established in 2018
2018 establishments in Bihar
Private universities in India